In mathematics, a Zariski geometry consists of an abstract structure introduced by Ehud Hrushovski and Boris Zilber, in order to give a characterisation of the Zariski topology on an algebraic curve, and all its powers. The Zariski topology on a product of algebraic varieties is very rarely the product topology, but richer in closed sets defined by equations that mix two sets of variables. The result described gives that a very definite meaning, applying to projective curves and compact Riemann surfaces in particular.

Definition 

A Zariski geometry consists of a set X and a topological structure on each of the sets

X, X2, X3, ...

satisfying certain axioms.

(N) Each of the Xn is a Noetherian topological space, of dimension at most n.

Some standard terminology for Noetherian spaces will now be assumed.

(A) In each Xn, the subsets defined by equality in an n-tuple are closed. The mappings
 Xm → Xn
defined by projecting out certain coordinates and setting others as constants are all continuous.

(B) For a  projection

 p: Xm → Xn

and an irreducible closed subset Y of Xm, p(Y) lies between its closure Z and Z \ Z′ where Z′ is a proper closed subset of Z. (This is quantifier elimination, at an abstract level.)

(C) X is irreducible.

(D) There is a uniform bound on the number of elements of a fiber in a projection of any closed set in Xm, other than the cases where the fiber is X.

(E) A closed irreducible subset of Xm, of dimension r, when intersected with a diagonal subset in which s coordinates are set equal, has all components of dimension at least r − s + 1.

The further condition required is called very ample (cf. very ample line bundle).  It is assumed there is an irreducible closed subset P of some Xm, and an irreducible closed subset Q of P× X2, with the following properties:

(I) Given pairs (x, y), (x′, y′) in  X2, for some t in P, the set of (t, u, v) in Q includes (t, x, y) but not (t, x′, y′)

(J) For t outside a proper closed subset of P, the set of (x, y) in X2,  (t, x, y) in Q is an irreducible closed set of dimension 1.

(K) For all pairs  (x, y), (x′, y′) in  X2, selected from outside a proper closed subset, there is some t in P such that the set of (t, u, v) in Q includes (t, x, y) and (t, x′, y′).

Geometrically this says there are enough curves to separate points (I), and to connect points (K); and that such curves can be taken from a single parametric family.

Then Hrushovski and Zilber prove that under these conditions there is an algebraically closed field K, and a non-singular algebraic curve C, such that its Zariski geometry of powers and their Zariski topology is isomorphic to the given one. In short, the geometry can be algebraized.

References

 

Model theory
Algebraic curves
Vector bundles